Tomeu is a given name. Notable people with the name include:

Tomeu Llompart (born 1944), Spanish footballer and coach
Tomeu Nadal (born 1989), Spanish footballer
Tomeu Penya (born 1949), Spanish singer-songwriter

See also
Tomer (name)

Masculine given names